Eriocaulon sharmae is a critically endangered monocotyledonous plant endemic to Amboli and Sindhudurg in the state of Maharashtra, India.

References

sharmae
Flora of Maharashtra